Camporrotuno is a locality located in the municipality of Aínsa-Sobrarbe, in Huesca province, Aragon, Spain. In 2020, it had a population of 22.

Geography 
Camporrotuno is located 107km east-northeast of Huesca.

References

Populated places in the Province of Huesca